GIFA may refer to:

 Global Indian Film Awards, awards ceremony
 Global Islamic Finance Awards, within the banking industry
 , four-yearly metal/foundry trade-show industry